Kolibree is a French company based in Neuilly-sur-Seine, France that is known for developing a smart toothbrush. Colibri means "hummingbird" in French; perhaps a reference to their signature product's light weight, about 64g.

Kickstarter
In April 2014, the company launched a Kickstarter crowdfunding campaign for its device and raised over $100,000.

Design
The toothbrush connects via Bluetooth to a smartphone app and can tell users whether they are brushing well. Also, available is a choice of video games, in which good brushing is rewarded with high scores in the game. The toothbrush has removable heads; thus the same brush can be shared by different people without worry of contamination.

AI toothbrush
In 2017, at CES Las Vegas, Kolibree introduced ARA, an updated version of its toothbrush, promising AI software that records and detects bad brushing habits. Using computer vision technology, motion tracking and the phone's front-facing camera, incentivizes kids to brush their teeth with an augmented reality gaming app.

AR toothbrush
In 2018 at CES Las Vegas, Kolibree introduced Magik, a kids' version of its toothbrush with Augmented Reality detection that helps children play with a smartphone App while cleaning their teeth.

"hum" by Colgate
In August 2020, Colgate-Palmolive unveiled to Wall Street the "hum" smart toothbrush, developed in partnership with Kolibree.

References

External links
 Company website
 Article on Kolibree Magik toothbrush on Kidscreen.com
 Kickstarter campaign for Kolibree
 Press statement for "hum"

Dental companies
French brands
Medical technology companies of France